Adam Waszkiewicz (born 6 December 1993) is a Polish professional footballer who plays as a right-back for Legionovia Legionowo.

External links
 
 

1993 births
Living people
Footballers from Łódź
Association football defenders
Polish footballers
Jagiellonia Białystok players
Raków Częstochowa players
Stal Stalowa Wola players
Ekstraklasa players
I liga players
II liga players
III liga players